The Dominican Republic competed at the 1980 Summer Olympics in Moscow, USSR.

Results by event

Athletics
Men's 100 metres
Gerardo Suero
 Heat — 10.53
 Quarterfinals — 10.57 (→ did not advance)

Women's 100 m Hurdles
Marisela Peralta 
 Heat — 14.18 (→ did not advance)

Diving
Men's Springboard
 Reynaldo Castro
 Preliminary Round — 469.14 points (→ 18th place, did not advance)

Men's Platform
 César Augusto Jimenez
 Preliminary Round — 369.09 points (→ 21st place, did not advance)

References
Official Olympic Reports

Nations at the 1980 Summer Olympics
1980
Oly